Rabokki is a type of tteokbokki (stir-fried rice cakes), with added ramyeon noodles. It is a street food commonly sold in bunsikjip (snack bars). As with other tteokbokki dishes, eomuk (fish cakes) and boiled eggs are a common addition. Cream sauce or western-style chili sauce may be used instead of gochujang (Korean chili paste).

Etymology 
Rabokki is a Korean language portmantaeu that combines the words for ramyeon (라면), and tteokbokki (떡볶이). The literal meaning is to add ramyeon noodles to rice cakes.

References 

Bunsik
South Korean noodle dishes
Street food in South Korea